Route 359 is a collector road in the Canadian province of Nova Scotia.

It is located in Kings County and connects Kentville near Trunk 1 with Halls Harbour.

Communities
Kentville
Aldershot
Steam Mill Village
Centreville
East Halls Harbour Road
Halls Harbour

See also
List of Nova Scotia provincial highways

References

Nova Scotia provincial highways
Roads in Kings County, Nova Scotia